Padrón is a concello (Galician for municipality) in the Province of A Coruña, in Galicia (Spain) within the comarca of O Sar. It covers an area of 48.4 km², is 95 km from A Coruña and 23km from Santiago de Compostela. , had a population of 8968 according to the INE.
Padrón is divided into five parishes:
(San Pedro de) Carcacía
(Santa María de) Cruces
(Santa María de) Herbón
(Santa María de) Iria Flavia (or Iría Flavia)
(Santiago de) Padrón

History and etymology
Iria Flavia was a Celtic settlement, capital the Capori, located in the confluence of rivers Sar and Ulla, and on the crossroads to Braga (Portugal) and Astorga (León). It became Iria Flavia under Titus Flavius Vespasianus, and it was the Episcopal See during the Middle Ages until Alfonso II of Asturias moved it to Compostela after the foundation of Santiago's sepulchre. In modern days, the town is the last stop on the Portuguese Way path of the Camino de Santiago. 

When the name "Padrón" became more popular, "Iria Flavia" was consigned to a small hamlet (the current parish).

According to tradition, it was in Iria Flavia that Apostle Saint James first preached during his stay in Hispania. Soon after his death that his disciples Theodore and Athanasius brought his head and his body to Iria from Jerusalem in a stone boat. They moored the boat to a pedrón (Galician for big stone), hence the new toponym given to the place. The two disciples remained in Iria Flavia (now Padrón) to preach after burying the Apostle in Compostela, and the legendary pedrón can be seen today at the parish church of Santiago de Padrón.

Padrón soon became a popular passing place in the Camino de Santiago pilgrimage route and suffered several attacks in the 10th and 11th centuries by both Vikings and Normans. The invasion attempts decreased after the Torres del Oeste (West Towers) were built as protection in Catoira (Pontevedra) by Bishop Cresconio. This led to a great period of prosperity during the 12th and 13th centuries.

During this period and under Archbishop Diego Gelmírez (born in the West Towers) a quay was built by the Sar river bank. From its shipyard came the first galleys of the Galician Navy.

In the 15th century, Archbishop Rodrigo de Luna moved Santiago de Compostela's Town Council to Padrón for two years, to fend off the influence of the Counts of Altamira. His sepulcher with a reclining sculpture can be found at the Iria Flavia parish church.

The focus of attention gradually moved to nearby Compostela, capital of Galicia.

Economy
The economy is based mainly on fishing and agriculture (peppers, kiwis, flowers are grown), and to a lesser extent on other industries (wood, tanned hide, aluminum), tourism and trade, due to its location at a crossroads.

Demography 
From:INE Archiv

Food

The most famous produce of Padrón are its peppers (Galician pementos de Padrón),  which are small green  peppers from the Capsicum annuum family. They are served fried with olive oil and coarse salt. Most taste sweet and mild, though some are particularly hot and spicy, which gives its character to the dish and is perfectly captured in the popular "Os pementos de Padrón, uns pican e outros non" (Galician for "Padrón peppers, some are hot and some are not"). The level of heat varies according to the capsaicin of each pepper. Although it's not always the case, the peppers grown towards August/September tend to contain more capsaicin than the ones of June/July.

About 15,000 kg of peppers are grown in Padrón each year (mostly in the valley of the parish of Herbón) between June and September. In 1979 the first Festa do Pemento de Padrón was organized in Herbón, a popular gastronomic event that has been held every year since, the first Sunday in August. The festa takes place in the carballeira of Herbón's Franciscan friary, since it was the Franciscan friars who brought the first pepper seeds from Mexico in the 16th century, which then were adapted to the soil, the Oceanic climate of the Valley and grown with special techniques.

Notable people
Padrón has been home to four important writers:
Macias the Lover (?-1434), medieval poet,
Juan Rodríguez de la Cámara (1390-1450), also known as Juan Rodríguez de Padrón, medieval writer, poet.
Rosalía de Castro (1837-1885), Romantic poet and pioneer of feminism.
Camilo José Cela (1916–2002), writer and Nobel Prize winner.

References

External links

Rosalía de Castro Museum and Foundation, in Padrón
Camilo José Cela Foundation, in Padrón

Municipalities in the Province of A Coruña